The Italian LNP Cup, known as Turkish Airlines Cup for sponsorship reasons, is an annual cup competition for Italian basketball teams organized by Italy's second league in the Italian basketball league system, the Serie A2 Basket. The tournament is organised by the Lega Nazionale Pallacanestro (LNP), the organisation responsible for running the national second division Serie A2, third division Serie B, and fourth division Serie C championships.

A different cup is awarded for each of these respective divisions, though the event has been organised at the same date and place (under the name Rhythm'n'Basket Festival) from 2014, up to the current 2016 edition.

Organisation
For the 2015 edition, the Serie A2 Final Six was composed of the four best ranked teams in Serie A2 Gold and the two best ranked teams in Serie A2 Silver at the end of the league first stage.
The Serie B Final Four was preceded by a preliminary phase that saw the first-ranked teams of each league group (A, B, C, D) play against the second-ranked team of another group for a place in the cup.
The Serie C Final Eight was also preceded by a prelimany phase, in which teams from different regions were pitted against each other for spots in the final phase.

The Rhythm'n'Basket (RnB) festival, organised since 2014 in association with Rimini Fiera, sees the games take place in the Rimini Expo Centre halls, one of which is converted for the occasion into two basketball courts (named Parigi 1999 and Atene 2004 in reference to the titles of the Italian national team) complete with two stands for a capacity of 5,000.

The 2017 edition, sees the games take place in Unipol Arena in Bologna for a record capacity of 9,513. Since 2017 Turkish Airlines become new title sponsor of the tournament for Serie A2 and Serie B.

Serie A2 Cup champions (2nd-tier level)

Serie B Cup champions (3rd-tier level)

Serie C Cup champions (4th-tier level)

Sponsorship names
Throughout the years, due to sponsorship, the competition has been known as:
Adecco Cup (2014)
IG Basket Cup (2015–2016)
Turkish Airlines Cup (2017–present)

See also
Italian Basketball Cup  - The Cup for first division Serie A sides
Serie A2 Basket - Also organised by the LNP
Serie B Basket - Also organised by the LNP

Notes

References

Basketball cup competitions in Italy
1998 establishments in Italy
Basketball league cup competitions in Europe